Joan Ryan is an American actress and singer, who played Judy Denmark/Ginger Del Marco in the Los Angeles production of Ruthless!, and Miss Tina Paladrino on Good Morning, Miss Bliss, the television series that became Saved by the Bell.

Career
Ryan was born in Philadelphia, Pennsylvania and raised in Newport Beach, California. She attended the advanced training program at the American Conservatory Theater in San Francisco, California, and while enrolled, appeared in productions of The Taming of the Shrew, Cyrano de Bergerac and A Doll's House as a member of the conservatory's theater company. Upon completion of the program, Ryan moved to Los Angeles, California where she performed in productions of Little Shop of Horrors, Footloose, Angry Housewives, Nite Club Confidential, and Joseph and the Amazing Technicolor Dreamcoat.

In 1988, Ryan was cast as Miss Tina Paladrino on the NBC/Disney Channel series Good Morning, Miss Bliss. The show ran for a single season on Disney Channel before being moved to NBC and re-imagined as Saved by the Bell. In 1992, Good Morning, Miss Bliss was renamed Saved by the Bell: The Junior High Years and incorporated into the Saved by the Bell syndication package on TBS.

In 1993, Ryan appeared as Judy Denmark/Ginger Del Marco in the Los Angeles stage production of Ruthless! The Musical. The following year she would also appear on the original cast recording released by Varèse Sarabande.

Alongside her work in theater and television, Ryan also records and performs as a solo vocal artist. Her one-woman show, entitled Joan Ryan Live!, has been performed at clubs including Feinstein's/54 Below, Birdland, Catalina Jazz Club, and The Green Room 42, and in 2013 earned Ryan the title of BroadwayWorld's Best Female Cabaret Artist.

Theatre

Film and television

Discography

Cast recordings
 Strouse, Schwartz, Schwartz (2006) — Kritzerland
 The Perfect Year: The Music of Andrew Lloyd Webber (2004) — Kritzerland
 Dream: Lyrics and Music Of Johnny Mercer (2003) — LML Music
 Life Upon the Wicked S.T.A.G.E. (2002) — LML Music
 Everyone Has a Story: The Songs of Adryan Russ (2001) — LML Music
 Lerner, Loewe, Lane & Friends (1998) — Varèse Sarabande
 Sondheim: A Celebration (1997) — Varèse Sarabande
 Ruthless! (1994) — Varèse Sarabande
 George & Ira Gershwin: A Musical Celebration (1994) — MCA

Solo albums
Joan Ryan (1995) — LML Music

References

External links
 Official website
 

Year of birth missing (living people)
Living people
American film actresses
American television actresses
American musical theatre actresses
American cabaret performers
Singers from Pennsylvania
21st-century American women singers
21st-century American singers